
Year 455 BC was a year of the pre-Julian Roman calendar. At the time, it was known as the Year of the Consulship of Vaticanus and Cicurinus (or, less frequently, year 299 Ab urbe condita). The denomination 455 BC for this year has been used since the early medieval period, when the Anno Domini calendar era became the prevalent method in Europe for naming years.

Events 
 By place 
 Greece 
 Athens, under Athenian general Tolmides, sends 100 ships around the Peloponnesus and they set fire to the Spartan naval base at Gythion. As a result, Athens gains the agreement of the Achaean cities to join the Delian League. Athenian forces then go on to attack the Spartan allies on the Corinthian Gulf. Athens is now able to confine Sparta to the southern Peloponnesus.
 The Athenians suffer a severe defeat in Egypt at the hands of the Persians. After being cut off in the Nile Delta, the Athenian fleet is defeated, and the Athenian army retreats across the Sinai Desert to Byblos before its remnants are rescued. The Egyptian rebel Inaros is crucified by the Persians. The Athenians decide against any further military activity in Egypt.

China
 Spring and Autumn period: The Battle of Jinyang begins with the armies of Zhi, Wei and Han laying siege to Jinyang.

 By topic 
 Literature 
 Euripides presents his earliest known tragedy, Peliades, in the Athenian festival of Dionysia.

Births

Deaths

References